Celaenephes is a genus of beetles in the family Carabidae, containing the following species:

 Celaenephes linearis (Walker, 1858)
 Celaenephes parallelus Schmidt-Gobel, 1846

References

Lebiinae